The Cleveland mayoral election of 1947 saw the election of Thomas A. Burke as Mayor of Cleveland, defeating Republican challenger Eliot Ness.

General election

References

Mayoral elections in Cleveland
Cleveland mayoral
Cleveland
November 1947 events in the United States
1940s in Cleveland